This is a list of awards and nominations (incomplete) that American singer Donna Summer (1948–2012) has received throughout her career.

Incomplete overview
 NAACP Image Award
 One time Juno Award nomination for Best Selling International Single, "I Feel Love"
 Three Multi-Platinum albums in the United States
 Eleven of her albums went Gold in the United States
 Twelve Gold singles
 Six American Music Awards
 She was the first female African American to receive an MTV Video Music Awards nomination ("Best Female Video" and "Best Choreography" for "She Works Hard for the Money")
 Summer has received five Grammy Awards
1978 – Best R&B Vocal Performance (Female), "Last Dance"
1979 – Best Rock Vocal Performance (Female), "Hot Stuff"
1983 – Best Inspirational Performance, "He's a Rebel"
1984 – Best Inspirational Performance, "Forgive Me"
1997 – Best Dance Recording, "Carry On"
 Thirteen other Grammy Award nominations (total of eighteen)
1978 – Best Pop Vocal Performance (Female), "MacArthur Park"
1979 – Album of the Year, Bad Girls
1979 – Best Pop Vocal Performance (Female), "Bad Girls"
1979 – Best R&B Vocal Performance (Female), "Dim All the Lights"
1979 – Best Disco Recording, "Bad Girls"
1980 – Best Pop Vocal Performance (Female), "On the Radio"
1981 – Best Rock Vocal Performance (Female), "Cold Love"
1981 – Best Inspirational Performance, "I Believe in Jesus"
1982 – Best Rock Vocal Performance (Female), "Protection"
1982 – Best R&B Vocal Performance (Female), "Love Is in Control (Finger on the Trigger)"
1983 – Best Pop Vocal Performance (Female), "She Works Hard for the Money"
1983 - Album of the Year, "Flashdance," Original Motion Picture Soundtrack - "Romeo"
1999 – Best Dance Recording, "I Will Go with You (Con te Partirò)"
 Summer placed a Top Forty hit on the Billboard Hot 100 in every year from 1975 ("Love to Love You Baby") to 1984 ("There Goes My Baby")
 Summer is Billboard's top charting Hot 100 artist from 1976 to 1982 (pre MTV era), with 12 top 10 singles.
 Summer was the first artist to score three consecutive number-one double albums
 Summer was twice honored by the Dance Music Hall of Fame; once with her induction as a recording artist and again with the induction for her influential single "I Feel Love"
 Summer's Billboard number-one Disco/Club Play hits spans from 1975's "Love to Love You Baby" through 2010's "To Paris with Love"
 In 2013, Summer was posthumously inducted into the Rock and Roll Hall of Fame
 Summer was nominated for Best Original Song – Motion Picture of 35th Golden Globe Awards (1978) with John Barry

ASCAP Pop Music Awards

!Ref.
|-
| 1990
| "This Time I Know It's for Real"
| Most Performed Song
| 
|

Grammy Awards (USA)
Donna Summer stands alone as the only artist to win awards in 4 different genres: R&B, rock, dance and gospel. She has been nominated in 5 different genres: pop, R&B, rock, dance and gospel. She has received 5 Grammy Awards out of 18 nominations.

American Music Awards (USA)

Dance Music Hall of Fame

NAACP Image Awards

Ivor Novello Awards
{| class="wikitable"
|-
!Year
!Nominated work
!Award
!Result
!Ref.
|-
| 1990
| "This Time I Know It's for Real"
| Most Performed Work
| 
|

Juno Awards

Rock & Roll Hall of Fame

MTV Video Music Awards

References

Summer, Donna
Awards